Bliuming Stadium is a multi-use stadium in Kramatorsk, Ukraine. It is currently used mostly for football matches, and is the home of FC Avanhard Kramatorsk. The stadium holds 10,000 spectators.

Originally built in 1937, the stadium belonged to the New Kramatorsk Engineering Factory. Following the World War II, the stadium was rebuilt in 1950s. It is located in the Pushkin City Park of Kramatorsk, Sotsmistechko neighborhood. It is one of the two main stadiums in Kramatorsk, with the other being Prapor (Avanhard) Stadium located to the south in Stara Petrivka in the Sad Bernatskoho Park (Bernard Garden).

External links
Bliuming Stadium (Jigsaw puzzle). Kramatorsk Post. 25 June 2020
Bliuminh Stadium. Footboom.com
At the renovated Bliuminh Stadium met football teams of Kramatorsk and Sloviansk (На обновленном стадионе "Блюминг" встретились футбольные команды Краматорска и Славянска). Obschezhitie. 24 May 2015

Football venues in Ukraine
Buildings and structures in Kramatorsk
Sports venues in Donetsk Oblast